The 2018–19 Minerva Punjab FC Season was the club's third season in the I-League.

Sponsors
As of 16 October 2018

Transfers
Minerva Punjab saw an exodus of top players after their I-League victory in the 2017 season. Perhaps the biggest departure that Minerva Punjab was that of Chencho Gyeltshen. The Bhutanese attacker was the stand-out performer for Minerva in 2017 and was subsequently sold to Bengaluru FC. His departure left a huge gap in the Minerva squad.

Following Chencho out of the door were Kiran Chemjong, Sukhdev Singh, Kamalpreet Singh, Bali Gagandeep, Kassim Aidara, Girik Khosla, Rakshit Dagar, and Abhishek Ambekar.

Kamalpreet Singh, Gagandeep, Aidara, and Rakshit Dagar all signed for Minerva's title rivals East Bengal F.C. Sukhdev Singh and Ambekar moved on to Mohun Bagan. Ahead of the 2018-19 I-League season, Minerva were left with a depleted squad.

On 6 July 2018 Minerva Punjab signed forward Yu Kuboki on a permanent transfer from Australian club Sydney Olympic FC. He had been in scintillating form for Sydney the previous season, scoring 11 goals in 22 matches as an attacking midfielder or a withdrawn striker.

In August 2018 Minerva signed three players including Nigerian forward Philip Njoku.

In September 2018 they signed former Ozone FC striking duo C. S. Sabeeth and Brazilian Robert De Souza. They also extended contracts with defender Akashdeep Singh and striker Akash Sangwan.

Contract Extension

In

Out

Squad

First-team squad

Team management

As of 9 August 2018.

Pre-season and friendlies
Minerva Punjab kicked off their pre-season preparations by participating in the 2018 Punjab State Super Football League from 26 August 2018. With 4 wins and 3 draws Minerva finished second in the league table. They beat league leader FC Punjab Police in the finals to win the 32nd Punjab State Super Football League title.

Punjab State Super League

Notes

J&K Invitational Cup
Minerva Punjab participated in the J&K Invitational Cup organized by Real Kashmir FC. It was a knock out tournament.

Notes

Friendlies

Competitions

I-League

Matches

League table

Results summary

Results by round

2019 AFC Champions League

The AFC Champions League is the premier continental football competition organized by the Asian Football Confederation (AFC). As the champions of the I-League the previous season, Minerva Punjab FC earned a chance to qualify for the tournament. India did not have a direct-entry spot in the AFC Champions League and thus the champion team from India had to qualify for the tournament through the preliminary rounds. Minerva Punjab were put up against Saipa FC of Iran.

2019 AFC Cup

Statistics

Goal Scorers

Hat-tricks

References

See also
 2018–19 in Indian football
 2018–19 I-League

Minerva Punjab F.C.
RoundGlass Punjab FC seasons